Lee Hee-seong (Korean: 이희성; also known as Lee Seung-Bin) born 27 May 1990 in South Korea) is a South Korean footballer who plays as a goalkeeper for Ansan Greeners FC.

Career

Lee started playing as goalkeeper in 5th grade because he thought that "saving while falling looked cool".

In high school, Lee was regarded as a better goalkeeper than future international Kim Seung-gyu, winning Most Valuable Player at the 2008 High School Challenge and giving the trophy to his dying father in the hospital. However, he later envied Kim, who played in the 2014 World Cup, and contemplated quitting football while playing for Ulsan Hyundai's reserves. 

On the 17th of June 2015, Lee started against Jeonbuk Hyundai in his first league appearances that season. In the 37th minute, he struck his head against striker Lee Dong-gook's knee, causing a broken temple. The injury was life threatening, but he eventually recovered with the support of his girlfriend.

References

External links
 
 

Living people
1990 births
South Korean footballers
Association football goalkeepers
Ulsan Hyundai FC players
Ulsan Hyundai Mipo Dockyard FC players
Ansan Greeners FC players
K League 1 players
K League 2 players
K3 League (2007–2019) players